Tall Timber may refer to:

 Tall Timber (1928 film), a 1928 silent animated short film
 Tall Timber (1926 film), a 1926 Australian silent film
 Park Avenue Logger, also known as Tall Timber, a 1937 film
 Tall Timber, Colorado, United States

See also
 Tall Timbers (disambiguation)